Lynn Boyd Watkins (October 9, 1836 – March 2, 1901) was a justice of the Louisiana Supreme Court from April 19, 1886, to March 2, 1901.

Born in Caldwell County, Kentucky, Watkins served in the Confederate States Army and became a District Judge, in Louisiana in 1871. His brother John D. Watkins was also a prominent attorney.

Watkins died in New Orleans, Louisiana.

References

Justices of the Louisiana Supreme Court
1836 births
1901 deaths
U.S. state supreme court judges admitted to the practice of law by reading law
People from Caldwell County, Kentucky
19th-century American judges